Mucibacter is a Gram-negative, non-spore-forming, short-rod-shaped and motile genus of bacteria from the family of Chitinophagaceae with one known species (Mucibacter soli). Mucibacter soli produces mucin.

References

Chitinophagia
Bacteria genera
Monotypic bacteria genera
Taxa described in 2020